Christopher Toland (born June 21, 1985 in San Francisco, California) is an American former competitive figure skater. He is the 2004 Nebelhorn Trophy bronze medalist and the 2004 U.S. national junior champion. He was coached by Ken Congemi.

Results

References

1985 births
Living people
American male single skaters
Sportspeople from San Francisco